A list of all windmills and windmill sites which lie in the current ceremonial county of West Sussex.


Locations

A

B

C

D – F

G – H

I – L

N – P

R – S

T – W

Sources

Maps

1596 Robert Morden
1724 Richard Budgen
1762 John Rocque
1777 Andrews & Drury
1789 Lindley & Crossley
1795 Gardner & Gream
1813 Ordnance Survey
1823 C & G Greenwood
1823* Bryant

References

Windmills in West Sussex
West Sussex
Windmilles